In mathematics, the Abel transform, named for Niels Henrik Abel, is an integral transform often used in the analysis of spherically symmetric or axially symmetric functions. The Abel transform of a function f(r) is given by

 

Assuming that f(r) drops to zero more quickly than 1/r, the inverse Abel transform is given by

 

In image analysis, the forward Abel transform is used to project an optically thin, axially symmetric emission function onto a plane, and the inverse Abel transform is used to calculate the emission function given a projection (i.e. a scan or a photograph) of that emission function.

In absorption spectroscopy of cylindrical flames or plumes, the forward Abel transform is the integrated absorbance along a ray with closest distance y from the center of the flame, while the inverse Abel transform gives the local absorption coefficient at a distance r from the center. Abel transform is limited to applications with axially symmetric geometries. For more general asymmetrical cases, more general-oriented reconstruction algorithms such as algebraic reconstruction technique (ART), maximum likelihood expectation maximization (MLEM), filtered back-projection (FBP) algorithms should be employed.

In recent years, the inverse Abel transform (and its variants) has become the cornerstone of data analysis in photofragment-ion imaging and photoelectron imaging. Among recent most notable extensions of inverse Abel transform are the "onion peeling" and "basis set expansion" (BASEX) methods of photoelectron and photoion image analysis.

Geometrical interpretation 

In two dimensions, the Abel transform F(y) can be interpreted as the projection of a circularly symmetric function f(r) along a set of parallel lines of sight at a distance y from the origin. Referring to the figure on the right, the observer (I) will see

 

where f(r) is the circularly symmetric function represented by the gray color in the figure. It is assumed that the observer is actually at x = ∞, so that the limits of integration are ±∞, and all lines of sight are parallel to the x axis.
Realizing that the radius r is related to x and y as r2 = x2 + y2, it follows that

 

for x > 0. Since f(r) is an even function in x, we may write

 

which yields the Abel transform of f(r).

The Abel transform may be extended to higher dimensions. Of particular interest is the extension to three dimensions. If we have an axially symmetric function f(ρ, z), where ρ2 = x2 + y2 is the cylindrical radius, then we may want to know the projection of that function onto a plane parallel to the z axis. Without loss of generality, we can take that plane to be the yz plane, so that

 

which is just the Abel transform of f(ρ, z) in ρ and y.

A particular type of axial symmetry is spherical symmetry. In this case, we have a function f(r), where r2 = x2 + y2 + z2.
The projection onto, say, the yz plane will then be circularly symmetric and expressible as F(s), where s2 = y2 + z2. Carrying out the integration, we have

 

which is again, the Abel transform of f(r) in r and s.

Verification of the inverse Abel transform 
Integration by parts then yields

Differentiating formally,

Now substitute this into the inverse Abel transform formula:

By Fubini's theorem, the last integral equals

Generalization of the Abel transform to discontinuous F(y) 

The Abel transform of a function f(r) is under these circumstances again given by:

Assuming f(r) drops to zero more quickly than 1/r, the inverse Abel transform is however given by

where  is the Dirac delta function and  the Heaviside step function. The extended version of the Abel transform for discontinuous F is proven upon applying the Abel transform to shifted, continuous , and it reduces to the classical Abel transform when . If  has more than a single discontinuity, one has to introduce shifts for any of them to come up with a generalized version of the inverse Abel transform which contains n additional terms, each of them corresponding to one of the n discontinuities.

Relationship to other integral transforms

Relationship to the Fourier and Hankel transforms 
The Abel transform is one member of the FHA cycle of integral operators. For example, in two dimensions, if we define A as the Abel transform operator, F as the Fourier transform operator and H as the zeroth-order Hankel transform operator, then the special case of the projection-slice theorem for circularly symmetric functions states that

 

In other words, applying the Abel transform to a 1-dimensional function and
then applying the Fourier transform to that result is the same as applying
the Hankel transform to that function. This concept can be extended to higher
dimensions.

Relationship to the Radon transform 

Abel transform can be viewed as the Radon transform of an isotropic 2D function f(r). As f(r) is isotropic, its Radon transform is the same at different angles of the viewing axis. Thus, the Abel transform is a function of the distance along the viewing axis only.

See also 
 GPS radio occultation

References 

 

Integral transforms
Image processing
Niels Henrik Abel